The Menzies Institute for Medical Research is an Australian medical research institute of the University of Tasmania based in Hobart, Tasmania. Formerly known as the Menzies Centre for Population Health Research, the institute was established in 1988 and conducts innovative, world-class medical research to improve human health and well-being.

History

In the late 1980s, the Menzies Foundation supported the establishment of an epidemiology research centre at the University of Tasmania in Hobart, to be named the Menzies Centre for Population Health Research. The foundation provided annual funding to the institute and was successful in obtaining matching funds from the Tasmanian government. The Menzies Centre for Population Health Research was formed in 1988 and became the Menzies Research Institute in 2004.

From modest beginnings, the Menzies Research Institute quickly gained a reputation for its ground-breaking work into the link between babies’ sleeping position and sudden infant death syndrome (SIDS). Menzies developed into an established centre for population health research, with a global reputation in epidemiology. Some notable successes included highlighting the importance of vitamin D in the development of bones in children and adults;  showing evidence of the link between early life sun exposure and susceptibility to multiple sclerosis;  and discovering platelets found in the blood kill the malaria parasite during the early stages of a malarial infection.

Current research
The Menzies Institute for Medical Research aspires to contribute significantly to human health and wellbeing, with particular emphasis upon research that takes advantage of Tasmania's unique population resource and other competitive advantages. Its research efforts focus on preventing a range of diseases including cancer, multiple sclerosis, cardiovascular disease, diabetes, chronic lung disease, osteoarthritis, osteoporosis, epilepsy and dementia.

The institute's five major research themes are public health and primary care, brain diseases and injury, heart and blood vessels, bone and muscle health, and cancer, genetics and immunology.

Research centres
The Menzies Research Institute Tasmania has two research centres; the Australian Cancer Research Foundation Tasmanian Inherited Cancer Centre and the Wicking Dementia and Research Education Centre.

See also

Health in Australia

References

External links
 

Schools and Faculties of the University of Tasmania
1988 establishments in Australia
Tasmania
Public health organizations
Organisations based in Hobart
Education in Hobart
Research institutes established in 1988
Science and technology in Tasmania